Prima Charter was a Polish charter airline, previously known as Fischer Air Polska. It commenced operations on 12 May 2005 and ceased operations on 14 January 2008.

History
Established as Fischer Air Polska in 2003, the airline started operations on 12 May 2005.  It was established by the Czech K&K Group, but was acquired by PTV in January 2006.  It operated charter flights to the Mediterranean, Canary Islands, Thailand, Kenya, Sri Lanka, the Dominican Republic and Venezuela. It ceased operations in October 2006. However, renamed Prima Charter, it reentered the market in late 2006, flying since at one time or another to all the destinations that Fischer Air Polska had served.  However, it operated to the end with a fleet of exactly one jet, still with Fischer Air markings, as opposed to two that Fischer Air Polska was leasing.

References

External links
Prima Charter

Defunct airlines of Poland
Airlines established in 2003
Airlines disestablished in 2008